The Angelus is a 1937 British crime film directed by Thomas Bentley and starring Anthony Bushell, Nancy O'Neil and Garry Marsh. The plot is about a nun who leaves her convent to hunt down a murderer. It was also released as Who Killed Fen Markham?

Cast
 Anthony Bushell - Brian Ware 
 Nancy O'Neil - June Rowland 
 Eve Gray - Elsie Blake 
 Mary Glynne - Sister Angelica 
 Garry Marsh - Fen Markham 
 Richard Cooper - Kenneth Blake 
 Charles Carson - John Ware 
 Amy Veness - Mrs. Grimes

References

External links

1937 films
1930s English-language films
Films directed by Thomas Bentley
1937 crime films
British crime films
Films set in England
Films shot at Twickenham Film Studios
British black-and-white films
1930s British films